Ceraleptus is a genus of leaf-footed bugs in the family Coreidae. There are about nine described species in Ceraleptus.

Species
These nine species belong to the genus Ceraleptus:
 Ceraleptus americanus Stål, 1870
 Ceraleptus denticulatus Froeschner, 1963
 Ceraleptus gracilicornis (Herrich-Schäffer, 1835)
 Ceraleptus lividus Stein, 1858
 Ceraleptus lugens Horváth, 1898
 Ceraleptus obtusus (Brullé, 1839)
 Ceraleptus pacificus Barber, 1914
 Ceraleptus probolus Froeschner, 1963
 Ceraleptus sartus Kiritshenko, 1912

References

Further reading

External links

 

Articles created by Qbugbot
Coreidae genera
Pseudophloeinae